Jaipal Singh Munda (3 January 1903 – 20 March 1970) was an Indian politician, writer, and sportsman. He was the member of the Constituent Assembly which debated on the new Constitution of the Indian Union. He captained the Indian field hockey team to clinch gold in the 1928 Summer Olympics in Amsterdam.

Later, he emerged as a campaigner for the causes of Adivasis and the creation of a separate homeland for them in central India. As a member of the Constituent Assembly of India, he campaigned for the rights of the whole tribal community.

Early life
Jaipal Singh Munda, also known as Pramod Pahan, was born in a Munda tribal family, on 3 January 1903 in Takra-Hatudami, Pahan Toli village of what was then Khunti subdivision (now declared district) of the then district of Ranchi in the Bengal presidency of British India (in the present-day State of Jharkhand).

In childhood, Singh's job was to look after the cattle herd. After initial schooling at the village, he was brought by a Rev. Kushalmai Sheetal to St Pauls Church school, and in 1910, he gained admission to St. Paul's School, Ranchi, which was run by the Christian Missionaries of the SPG Mission of the Church of England. A gifted field hockey player, Singh was a brilliant student and exhibited exceptional leadership qualities from a very young age. This was noticed by the missionaries, who took him to England for higher studies at the University of Oxford. He graduated from St. John's College, Oxford with Honours in Economics.

Hockey player
Singh was a member of the Oxford University Hockey Team. The hallmarks of his game as a deep defender were his clean tackling, sensible gameplay and well directed hard hits. He was the most versatile player in the Oxford University Hockey Team. His contribution to the University Hockey Team was recognised and he became the first Indian student to be conferred blue in Hockey.

In 1928, while he was in England, Singh was asked to captain the India hockey team for the 1928 Olympic Games. Under his captaincy the Indian team played 17 matches in the league stage, of which 16 were won and one drawn. However, due to a dispute with the English team manager, A. B. Rossier, Singh left the team after league phase and therefore could not play in the games in the knockout stage. In the final, the Indian Team defeated Holland by 3–0.

On returning to India, Singh was associated with Mohan Bagan Club of Calcutta and started its hockey team in 1929. He led that team in various tournaments. After retirement from active hockey, he served as Secretary of Bengal Hockey Association and as a member of the Indian Sports Council.

Personal life
Jaipal Singh Munda married Tara Wienfried Majumdar, the daughter of P.K Mujumdar and Egnesh Mujumdar in 1931 in Darjeeling in a Christian marriage ceremony. He had three children with Tara, two sons Birendra and Jayant and daughter Janki. Tara Banarjee was counsin of General Jayanto Nath Chaudhuri and grand daughter of Congress President Womesh Chunder Bonnerjee. His second marriage was with Jahanara Jeyaratnam, the daughter of a Sri Lankan who joined the Indian Civil service in 1954 who was srilankan Tamil. He had one son with Jahanara, Ranjit Jeyaratnam.

Career
Singh was selected to work in the Indian Civil Service, from which he later resigned. In 1934, he became a teacher at the Prince of Wales College at Achimota, Gold Coast, Ghana. In 1937, he returned to India as the Principal of the Rajkumar College, Raipur. In 1938, he joined the Bikaner princely state as foreign secretary.

Singh thought that with his varied experience he could be more useful to the country if he worked in the sphere of education. He wrote letters to the Bihar Congress President, Rajendra Prasad, asking to be allowed to contribute to Bihar's education sector, but received no positive answers. In the last month of 1938, Singh visited Patna and Ranchi. During this visit, he decided to enter politics by seeing the poor condition of the tribal people.

Singh became president of Adivasi Mahasabha in 1939. In 1940 at Ramgarh session of Congress, he discussed with Subash Chandra Bose the need to form separate state Jharkhand. Subash Chandra Bose replied that such request will affect the freedom struggle.  After the independence of India, the Adivasi Mahasabha re-emerged as Jharkhand Party and it accommodated non-tribal people to achieve long-term goals. He is popularly known as "Marang Gomke (meaning Great Leader) by the Adivasis of Chhotanagpur.

Jharkhand Party participated in election in 1952 and won 32 seats in Bihar legislative assembly. In 1955, Jharkhand party submitted a memorandum for creation of a separate state Jharkhand consisting of the tribal area of South Bihar to States Reorganization Commission but the demand was not conceded because the region had many languages and had no link language, Hindustani was majority language, tribal were in minority and there would be adverse effects of economy of state after separation.

Jaipal Singh was disappointed due to declining  popularity of his party and rejection of State demand by States Reorganization Commission. In 1962, It won 20 seats. He became a minister in Binodanand Jha's government in Bihar. He merged his party with Indian National Congress in 1963. However entire rank and file did not join the Congress.

Role in the Constituent Assembly debates

Singh was a gifted speaker and represented all the tribal people of India at the Constituent Assembly of India (which was responsible for drafting the constitution of Independent India). The following is an excerpt from a famous speech made by him, where, while welcoming the Objectives Resolution, he highlighted the issues faced by the Indian tribals: Jaipal Singh was a part of 3 Committees including Advisory Committee.

A seven-member delegation of Naga leaders consisting of Angami Zapu Phizo, T. Sakhrie, Kezehol and others went to Delhi in July 1947 to declare their intention of a sovereign, independent Naga territory. There, they met Muhammad Ali Jinnah, Mahatma Gandhi, as well as Singh, who warned the Nagas against the folly of fighting a war against the Government of India forces. As a precautionary measure, 3000 Assam Rifles troops were already stationed in the Naga Hills by then. During a Constituent Assembly debate, Singh rebuked the Nagas for seeking Independence. He pointed out that the situation in the Naga Hills might become very serious and dangerous soon. Along with others in the Interim Government, he had received a few telegraphs on the intention of the Nagas declaring independence. He stated,The Naga Hills have always been part of India and have never been anything like the Indian States; but the Nagas have been led to believing that they are not part of India and that as soon as the Dominion of India comes into being, the Naga Hills could be exclusively the property of the State of the Nagas... Those of us who came into contact with them [Nagas leaders who went to Delhi to represent their case] tried to tell them the plain truth. But I think it is necessary that something should be said on the floor of this Assembly clarifying the position... [In the latest telegram the Naga leaders rejected] an offer from the Assembly to come into the Union. There has been no question of any offer. No offer was necessary or called for. The Naga Hills have always been a part of India and will remain so.

Death

Jaipal Singh Munda died of cerebral hemorrhage on 20 March 1970 at his residence in New Delhi. He was 67, and left behind four children — a daughter and three sons. One of his sons is Jayant Jaypal Singh. He is the CEO of Calcutta cricket and football club.

A stadium named after him opened in Ranchi in 2013.

Jaipal Singh Munda stadium was opened in Indira Gandhi National Tribal University, Amarakntak by VC Prof. T.V. Kattimani in 2019.

"Chevening- Marang Gomke Jaipal Singh Munda Overseas Scholarship" -Recently the state government of Jharkhand under the able leadership of Chief Minister of Jharkhand Shri Hemant Soren has announced and launched an overseas scholarship scheme for students of Jharkhand to pursue Masters degree and M.Phil course in reputed institutions in the United Kingdom of Great Britain and Ireland. This scholarship is fully funded and the government of Jharkhand has also signed an MoU with the Government of England for educating the youths of Jharkhand especially from the scheduled tribes, scheduled castes, minorities and backward classes. This scholarship is named after the great leader Jaipal Singh Munda in which the government aims to uplift the students belonging to socially and economically vulnerable groups and give them opportunity for a quality education henceforth bringing hope in the lives of youths of Jharkhand and instilling in them the thought to give back to their state and being a part of Jharkhand developmental story. In the year 2022,about 20 students were selected for this prestigious scholarship and these students are currently pursuing their courses in reputed institutions of United Kingdom. Some of the meritorious students selected for this scholarship in the Year 2022 are Ajay Kumar Yadav son of Shri Ramesh Kumar Yadav(Ex-Servicemen) from Talbanna, Sahibganj district of Jharkhand state with Rank 5th in the state; Ajay Hembram, Madhuri Khalko, Pranav Kashyap, Sangeeta Kachhap and others.

Published works
Lo Bir Sendra : an autobiography : A memoir of Jaipal Singh Munda published in 2004. Edited by Rashmi Katyayan and published by Prabhat Khabar Publications, Ranchi.
Adivasidom: a collection of the articles and speeches of Jaipal Singh Munda, written in the 1940-50s, published in July 2017. Edited by Ashwini Kumar Pankaj and it was published by the Pyara Kerketta Foundation, Ranchi.

See also
List of Indian hockey captains in Olympics
Field hockey in India

References

External links
 
 profile

1903 births
1970 deaths
India MPs 1952–1957
India MPs 1957–1962
India MPs 1962–1967
India MPs 1967–1970
20th-century Indian writers
Adivasi politicians
Adivasi writers
Field hockey players at the 1928 Summer Olympics
Field hockey players from Jharkhand
People from Khunti district
Indian male field hockey players
Jharkhand Party politicians
Lok Sabha members from Jharkhand
Medalists at the 1928 Summer Olympics
Members of the Constituent Assembly of India
Munda people
Olympic field hockey players of India
Olympic gold medalists for India
Olympic medalists in field hockey